In physics and geosciences, the term spatial resolution refers to distance between independent measurements, or the physical dimension that represents a pixel of the image.  While in some instruments, like cameras and telescopes, spatial resolution is directly connected to angular resolution, other instruments, like synthetic aperture radar or a network of weather stations, produce data whose spatial sampling layout is more related to the Earth's surface, such as in remote sensing and satellite imagery.

See also
 Image resolution
 Ground sample distance
 Level of detail
 Resel

References

Accuracy and precision